Djemoussa Traore (born 20 January 2000) is a Malian footballer who plays.

References

External links
 

2000 births
Living people
Sportspeople from Bamako
Malian footballers
Malian expatriate footballers
Mali under-20 international footballers
Association football midfielders
Adana Demirspor footballers
Giresunspor footballers
Al-Dahab Club players
TFF First League players
Saudi Second Division players
Expatriate footballers in Turkey
Expatriate footballers in Saudi Arabia
Malian expatriate sportspeople in Turkey
Malian expatriate sportspeople in Saudi Arabia
Mali youth international footballers
21st-century Malian people